Samir Mitragotri (born 28 May 1971 in Solapur, India) is an Indian American professor at Harvard University, an inventor, an entrepreneur, and a researcher in the fields of drug delivery and biomaterials. He is currently the Hiller Professor of Bioengineering and Hansjörg Wyss Professor of Biologically Inspired Engineering at Harvard John A. Paulson School of Engineering and Applied Sciences and the Wyss Institute for Biologically Inspired Engineering. Prior to 2017, he was the Duncan and Suzanne Mellichamp Chair Professor at University of California, Santa Barbara.

Mitragotri is widely recognized for his contributions to the field of drug delivery. He is considered a pioneer of many novel drug delivery technologies, especially in the fields of transdermal, oral and targeted systems. He invented techniques to deliver drugs transdermally using low-frequency ultrasound, pulsed microjet injector, high throughput skin experimentation, skin penetrating peptides and ionic liquids. He also invented intestinal patches and ionic liquids for oral delivery of proteins. Mitragotri also pioneered nanoparticle-enabled cell therapies which use drug-loaded nanoparticles that hitch a ride on red blood cells, monocytes and other circulatory cells for tissue-specific delivery. Mitragotri's technologies are used to develop next generation therapies against diabetes, cancer, psoriasis, hemorrhage, trauma and infections.

Mitragotri has published over 300 research publications, has given over 500 presentations worldwide, and is an inventor on over 180 patents/applications. His publications are cited with an h-index of 102. Mitragotri is a member of the National Academy of Medicine and the National Academy of Inventors. He is also a member of the US National Academy of Engineering in 2015 for the development, clinical translation, and commercialization of transdermal drug delivery systems. He is a co-founder of several companies that are developing products based on his inventions. He received his PhD in chemical engineering at MIT and BS in chemical engineering from the Institute of Chemical Technology. Mitragotri serves on the editorial boards of several journals and currently serves as editor-in-chief of Bioengineering and Translational Medicine.

Awards and honors
Mitragotri's national and international awards include:
 Kydonieus Award, Controlled Release Society (2020)
Clemson Award, Society for Biomaterials (2017)
 Member, National Academy of Medicine (NAM) (2016)
 Fellow, Biomedical Engineering Society (BMES) (2015)
 Fellow, American Association of Pharmaceutical Scientists (AAPS) (2015)
 Fellow, Controlled Release Society (CRS) (2015)
 Andreas Acrivos Award for Professional Progress, American Institute of Chemical Engineers (AIChE) (2015)
 Member, National Academy of Engineering (NAE) (2015)
 Fellow, National Academy of Inventors (NAI) (2013)
 Fellow, American Association for the Advancement of Science (AAAS) (2012)
 Fellow, American Institute for Medical and Biological Engineering (AIMBE) (2010)
 Controlled Release Society’s Young Scientist Award (2008)
 American Institute of Chemical Engineers Allan P. Colburn award (2005)
 Selection by MIT's Technology Review Magazine as one of the world's top Innovators Under 35 (1999)

Journal associations
 Editor-in-chief, Bioengineering and Translational Medicine
 Associate editor, Journal of Controlled Release
 Editorial board, European Journal of Pharmaceutical Sciences

Biotech companies
Samir Mitragotri has co-founded several companies:
 Sontra Medical, Inc. (acquired by Echo Therapeutics) 
 fqubed, Inc. (acquired by Nuvo Research)
 Stratagent LifeSciences (acquired by Corium International)
 Seventh Sense Biosystems
 Dx Biosciences 
 Entrega
 Liquedon, LLC
 CAGE Bio Inc.
 Fount Biosciences
i2O Therapeutics

References

External links
1. UCSB Faculty Profile
2. Center for Bioengineering at UCSB
3. National Academy of Engineering Frontiers Article
4. Artificial Red Blood Cell Article
6. TR35 Profile

American bioengineers
American chemical engineers
1971 births
Living people
Institute of Chemical Technology alumni
University of California, Santa Barbara faculty
Indian biochemists
Engineers from Maharashtra
People from Solapur
Fellows of the American Institute for Medical and Biological Engineering
Members of the National Academy of Medicine
Fellows of the Biomedical Engineering Society
Members of the United States National Academy of Sciences
American people of Marathi descent